John M. St. Polis (born John Marie Sainpolis; November 24, 1873 – October 8, 1946) was an American actor.

Biography
St. Polis was born in New Orleans, Louisiana. Before starting his film career, he made a name for himself on the Broadway stage, most notably in the role of Frederik in the original production of The Return of Peter Grimm (1911–12) and the play's revival in 1921, both performed at the Belasco Theatre. He also appeared in a different role in the screen version in 1926.

He appeared in more than 120 films between 1914 and 1943. In all of his early roles, the actor is billed as John Sainpolis. His best-known performances are as Etienne Laurier in The Four Horsemen of the Apocalypse (1921), and as Comte Phillipe de Chagny in The Phantom of the Opera (1925).

St. Polis successfully made the transition from silent cinema to "talkies" with one of his most praised performances as Dr. John M. Besant, the father of Norma Besant (played by Mary Pickford) in Coquette (1929). He died on October 8, 1946 in Los Angeles, California from undisclosed causes, aged 72.

Selected filmography

 Soldiers of Fortune (1914) - Pres. Alvarez
 Joseph and His Coat of Many Colors (1914)
 Wormwood (1915) - Gaston Beauvais
 Bondwomen (1915) - Dr. Hugh Ellis
 The Salamander (1916) - Albert Sassoon
 The Yellow Passport (1916) - Fedia
 The Social Highwayman (1916) - Hanby
 The World Against Him (1916) - Dr. Hamilton Welsh
 The Fortunes of Fifi (1917) - Duvernet
 Sapho (1917) - Dejoie
 Sleeping Fires (1917) - Edwin Bryce
 The Mystic Hour (1917) - Clavering
 The Love That Lives (1917) - Harvey Brooks
 Public Defender (1917) - David Moulton
 The Mark of Cain (1917) - Judge Hoyt
 Resurrection (1918) - Simonson
 All Woman (1918) - Sam Tupper
 Money Mad (1918) - Martin Ross
 Laughting Bill Hyde (1918) - Black Jack Burg
 Stake Uncle Sam to Play Your Hand (1918)
 The Poison Pen (1919) - Dr. McKenna
 The Great Lover (1920) - Jean Paurel
 Old Dad (1920) - Jeffrey Bretton
 The Four Horsemen of the Apocalypse (1921) - Etienne Laurier
 Cappy Ricks (1921) - Skinner
 Shadows (1922) - Nate Snow
 The Hero (1923) - Andrew Lane
 Three Wise Fools (1923) - John Crawshay
 The Untameable (1923)  - Dr. Copin
 A Prince of a King (1923) - Mario
 Woman-Proof (1923) - Milo Bleech
 The Social Code (1923) - Defense Attorney
 Held to Answer (1923) - Hiram Burbeck
 A Fool's Awakening (1924) - Lt. Wedderburn
 Three Weeks (1924) - The King
 Mademoiselle Midnight (1924) - Colonel de Gontran (Prologue)
 Those Who Dance (1924) - Monahan
 The Alaskan (1924) - Rossland
 In Every Woman's Life (1924) - Dr. Philip Logan
 The Rose of Paris (1924) - André du Vallois
 The Folly of Vanity (1924) - Ridgeway (modern sequence)
 The Dixie Handicap (1924) - Dexter
 The Phantom of the Opera (1925) - Comte Philip de Chagny
 My Lady's Lips (1925) - Inspector
 Paint and Powder (1925) - Mark Kelsey
 The Far Cry (1926) - Count Filippo Sturani
 The Greater Glory (1926) - Prof. Leopold Eberhardt
 The Lily (1926) - Comte de Maigny
 The Return of Peter Grimm (1926) - Andrew McPherson (uncredited)
 Too Many Crooks (1927) - Erastus Mason
 The Unknown (1927) - Surgeon (uncredited)
 A Woman's Way (1928) - Mouvet
 The Grain of Dust (1928) - Mr. Burroughs
 The Power of Silence (1928) - Defense Attorney
 Marriage by Contract (1928) - Father
 The Gun Runner (1928) - The Presidente
 The Diplomats (1929, Short) - The King of Belgravia
 Why Be Good? (1929) - Pa Kelly
 Coquette (1929) - Dr. John Besant
 Fast Life (1929) - Andrew Stratton
 Party Girl (1930) - John Rountree
 The Melody Man (1930) - Von Kemper
 In the Next Room (1930) - Philip Vantine
 Guilty? (1930) - Polk
 The Three Sisters (1930) - Judge
 The Bad One (1930) - Judge
 A Devil with Women (1930) - Don Diego
 Kismet (1930) - The Imam Mahmud
 Captain Thunder (1930) - Pedro
 The Criminal Code (1931) - Dr. Rinewulf
 Beau Ideal (1931) - Judge Advocate
 Doctors' Wives (1931) - Dr. Mark Wyndram
 Transgression (1931) - Serafin, Arturo's Butler
 Men of the Sky (1931) - Madeleine's Father
 Their Mad Moment (1931) - Hotel Manager
 The Gay Diplomat (1931) - General
 The Yellow Ticket (1931) - Passport Official at Airport (uncredited)
 Heartbreak (1931) - U.S. Ambassador
 The Wide Open Spaces (1931, Short) - Townsman
 Alias the Doctor (1932) - Dr. Niergardt
 Lena Rivers (1932) - John Nichols
 Symphony of Six Million (1932) - Dr. Schifflen
 Forbidden Company (1932) - David Grant
 The Crusader (1932) - Robert Henley
 False Faces (1932) - Dr. McDonald (uncredited)
 If I Had a Million (1932) - Glidden Associate (uncredited)
 The Gambling Sex (1932) - John Tracy
 Call Her Savage (1932) - Doctor Consoling Nasa (uncredited)
 The Match King (1932) - Banker (uncredited)
 Terror Trail (1932) - Colonel Charles Ormsby
 The World Gone Mad (1933) - Grover Cromwell
 King of the Arena (1933) - Governor
 Cocktail Hour (1933) - French Police Investigator (uncredited)
 Notorious but Nice (1933) - John J. Martin
 Sing Sinner Sing (1933) - James Parks (uncredited)
 Guilty Parents (1934) - Defense Attorney
 The President Vanishes (1934) - Attorney General Davis (uncredited)
 Death from a Distance (1935) - Prof. Trowbridge
 The Lady in Scarlet (1935) - Jerome T. Shelby
 A Night at the Opera (1935) - Opera Conductor (uncredited)
 Magnificent Obsession (1935) - Seabury (uncredited)
 The Dark Hour (1936) - Dr. Munro
 Call of the Prairie (1936) - Banker Jim (uncredited)
 Three on the Trail (1936) - Sheriff Sam Corwin
 Below the Deadline (1936) - Mr. Abrams
 The Border Patrolman (1936) - Manning (uncredited)
 Woman in Distress (1937) - Duval (uncredited)
 Borderland (1937) - The Doctor
 A Day at the Races (1937) - Musician in orchestra (uncredited)
 Paradise Isle (1937) - Coxon
 Rustlers' Valley (1937) - Banker Crawford (uncredited)
 Jungle Menace (1937, Serial) - Chandler Elliott [Ch. 1]
 The Shadow Strikes (1937) - Caleb Delthern
 Saleslady (1938) - Crane
 International Crime (1938) - Roger Morton
 Phantom Ranger (1938) - Pat Doyle
 The Mysterious Rider (1938) - Townsman (uncredited)
 Mr. Wong, Detective (1938) - Carl Roemer
 Boys' Reformatory (1939) - Superintendent Keene
 They Shall Have Music (1939) - Davis
 Abe Lincoln in Illinois (1940) - Minor Role (uncredited)
 Knights of the Range (1940) - Doctor (uncredited)
 Rocky Mountain Rangers (1940) - Joseph Manners
 On the Spot (1940) - Doc Hunter
 Haunted House (1940) - Simkins
 Federal Fugitives (1941) - Doctor (uncredited)
 The Hard-Boiled Canary (1941) - Opera Conductor (uncredited)
 Hurricane Smith (1941) - Doctor (uncredited)
 Reap the Wild Wind (1942) - Devereaux Foreign Agent (uncredited)
 Crossroads (1942) - Professor (uncredited)
 Assignment in Brittany (1943) - Old Man at Inn (uncredited)

References

External links

portrait gallery(Univ. of Washington, Sayre)

1873 births
1946 deaths
American male stage actors
American male film actors
American male silent film actors
Male actors from New Orleans
20th-century American male actors